What Women Want is a 2000 American romantic comedy film.

What Women Want may also refer to:

 What Women Want (1920 film), a silent film directed by George Archainbaud and starring Louise Huff
 What Women Want (2011 film), Chinese remake of the original film
 What Women Want (Australia), Australian political organisation launched in 2007
 What Women Want (TV series), Malaysian reality television programme broadcast from 2006 to 2007

See also 
 What Men Want (disambiguation)